Mendor was a Finnish health technology company from Helsinki specialising in diabetes care solutions. The company's headquarters was located in the business district of Keilaniemi in Espoo, Finland. Mendor filed for bankruptcy in January 2017.

Products

The company has introduced a device named Mendor Discreet, a self-contained blood glucose meter. It allows users to upload and analyse results online using software known as Balance.

Diabetes Mine reviewed a pre-release model and gave it "high marks on form factor and user-friendliness," commenting that "there are limits to the innovation here".

History
Mendor was founded in December 2005 by Jukka Planman, Tuomas Planman and Kristian Ranta, after a successful entry in the national business plan competition Venture Cup. It was a portfolio company of Finnish early stage venture capital fund Veraventure and was voted as the most attractive company for venture capital investment amongst Finnish start-up companies.

Tech Tour, a European wide, independent non-profit organization committed to the development of emerging technology companies, selected Mendor as one of the top 30 most promising high growth Nordic technology companies. Mendor was also granted the Innosuomi / Uusimaa award in 2010.

In 2011, Red Herring, an international technology publication, selected Mendor for the TOP 100 list of European growth companies.

In 2012, TiE50, a US-based global organization that tracks technology growth companies, awarded Mendor with the Technology Award for Innovation.

In 2017 the company filed for bankruptcy.

References

External links

 

Companies established in 2005
Medical technology companies of Finland